= VHL Championship =

VHL Championship may refer to:

- Supreme Hockey League (Russian: Чемпионат Высшей хоккейной лиги)
- Supreme Hockey League Championship (Russian: Первенство Высшей хоккейной лиги)
